Żuławski (feminine: Żuławska; plural: Żuławscy) is a Polish surname. Notable people with the surname include:

 Andrzej Żuławski (1940-2016), Polish film director, the father of Xawery Żuławski
 Hanna Żuławska (1909–1988), Polish painter and sculptor
 Iwona Woicka-Żuławska (born 1972), Polish diplomat
 Jacek Żuławski (1907–1976), Polish painter
 Jerzy Żuławski (1874–1915), Polish writer
 Juliusz Żuławski (1910–1999), Polish writer
 Kazimiera Żuławska (1883–1971), Polish translator and activist
 Marek Żuławski (1908–1985), Polish painter and graphic artist
 Mirosław Żuławski (1913–1995), Polish writer and diplomatist
 Wawrzyniec Jerzy Żuławski (1916–1957), Polish alpinist, composer and writer
 Xawery Żuławski (born 1971), Polish film director, the son of Andrzej Żuławski
 Zygmunt Żuławski (1880–1949), Polish politician and activist

See also
 
 
Jerzy Żuławski family tree
16 Żuławski Batalion Remontowy
Żuławski cheese

Polish-language surnames